Alfred Hodges (1877 – 14 July 1928) was a British gymnast. He competed in the men's artistic individual all-around event at the 1908 Summer Olympics.

References

1877 births
1928 deaths
British male artistic gymnasts
Olympic gymnasts of Great Britain
Gymnasts at the 1908 Summer Olympics
Sportspeople from Birmingham, West Midlands
20th-century British people